The FIL World Luge Championships 1971 took place in Olang, Italy.

Men's singles

Women's singles

Men's doubles

Medal table

References
Men's doubles World Champions
Men's singles World Champions
Women's singles World Champions

FIL World Luge Championships
1971 in luge
1996 in Italian sport
Luge in Italy